Individuals is the second studio album by the Australian power pop group, Sunnyboys. It was released in May 1982 on Mushroom Records, and peaked at No. 23 on the Australian Kent Music Report albums chart.

Track listing

Charts

Release history

Personnel
Sunnyboys
 Bil Bilson – drums
 Richard Burgman – guitar
 Jeremy Oxley – guitar, vocals
 Peter Oxley – bass guitar

References 

1982 albums
Sunnyboys albums
Mushroom Records albums